Parliamentary elections were held in Poland on 6 November 1938, with Senate elections held a week later on 13 November. They were the last elections in the Second Polish Republic. This election was held under the April Constitution of 1935, which was written to favor the Sanation movement.

The Camp of National Unity, the party of the Sanation movement, won 164 of the 208 seats in the Sejm and 66 of the 96 seats in the Senate. Although multiple parties ran, all of them were controlled by the Camp of National Unity and the number of votes they received were chosen by the government beforehand.

Results

Sejm

Senate

References

Poland
1938 in Poland
Parliamentary elections in Poland
Election and referendum articles with incomplete results
November 1938 events
1938 elections in Poland